Honor Titus (born July 18, 1989) is an American artist who lives and works in Los Angeles, California. Since his first solo exhibition in 2019, he has received international recognition for his painting practice, which weaves together a surreal, expressive iconography with references drawn variously from literature, art history, music, architecture and American advertising traditions.

As the artist Henry Taylor wrote of Titus in Interview magazine, "Titus has struck out on his own with a series of romantic, figurative paintings that conjure nostalgic, art-historical vignettes (the leisure of lawns, car culture, dances), but casts them through a gripping surrealistic lens that feels startlingly fresh."
He currently resides in Los Angeles, California.

Life

Born in Brooklyn, New York in 1989, Titus came to prominence in the New York punk rock scene in the early 2010s as the lead singer of the band Cerebral Ballzy (2009-2015).  At this time, Titus also became known for his poetry through independent readings in New York City, where he became associated with the artist Raymond Pettibon, who provided the cover art for Cerebral Ballzy’s first album. Titus began working in Pettibon’s studio, where he assisted in painting and developed in interest in stylized graphic art. Later, the artist Henry Taylor also mentored Titus and gave him his first solo exhibition at Henry Taylor Gallery, introducing him to the Los Angeles contemporary art landscape.

Work

Since moving to Los Angeles in 2016, Titus has focused exclusively on his visual art practice as a painter and draughtsman. His work has since received extensive critical acclaim in publications such as The New York Times, Frieze magazine, Artnet, Interview and Art in America. Between May – August 2021, his work was included in the institutional group exhibition 'and I will wear you in my heart of hearts' at the FLAG Art Foundation, New York. He is particularly noted for his use of vibrant, painterly colour and his distinct use of recurring motifs such as the significance of solitude and a nostalgia for the pre-digital era. His work has drawn comparisons to the influences of Edward Hopper and the nineteenth-century French Symbolist group Les Nabis.

Titus' early paintings portrayed faceless figures in minimal urban landscapes, reflecting the sense of isolation and loneliness that results from a condition of anonymity in the urban environment. Later themes have included compositions inspired by the ritual formality of athletic sports, such as swimming and dancing. In their bold immediacy and emphasis on flat, decorative patterns, Titus’s surfaces echo the hyper-realist graphic style practiced by artists inspired by American advertising, such as Alex Katz. He is represented by Timothy Taylor (gallery).

Exhibitions
Recent solo exhibitions include a solo booth presentation for Timothy Taylor at Frieze London (2021); For Heaven's Sake , Timothy Taylor, New York (2021); and Goodness Gracious, Henry Taylor Gallery, Los Angeles (2020). Group exhibitions include IRL at Timothy Taylor, London (2021); and I will wear you in my heart of heart, FLAG Art Foundation, New York, NY (2021); and (Nothing but) Flowers, Karma, New York (2021).

Other projects

Music
Cerebral Ballzy formed in Brooklyn, New York, in 2009 and disbanded in 2015. Their sound was influenced by 1980s punk music. Fronted by Titus, the band consisted of Mel Honore (bass), Jason Bannon (guitar) and Tom Kogut (drums). Cerebral Ballzy have released two full-length records which received international acclaim.  Their second full-length record, Jaded & Faded, was produced by Dave Sitek and released on Julian Casablancas' Cult Records on June 16, 2015. The record received strong reviews, most notably from NME, where Titus and Casablancas shared a cover for their "Heroes" issue in March 2014. The band shared the stage with top artists including The Strokes, Black Flag, Black Lips and OFF!  They also headlined the Monster NME Radar Tour in 2013.

Titus's musical influences include Jesus and Mary Chain, The Stone Roses, Beat generation writers, French existentialists such as Genet and Céline, and nineteenth-century French poets such as Rimbaud. He credits Siouxsie Sioux, early-eighties Robert Smith, Johnny Marr, Richard Hell, Johnny Thunders, Tom Verlaine, and Lou Reed as personal style icons.

Poetry
Titus has performed original poetry throughout small clubs in New York, as well as on BBC Radio 1. The 405 exclusively premiered a video featuring Titus reading a selection of his poetry on June 2, 2014.

Press
Titus' paintings have been met with widespread critical acclaim in publications such as The New York Times, Artnet, GQ and Interview magazine. In the summer of 2021, Titus' Olympics-themed painting 'Golden Bella' was commissioned as the cover of Town & Country.

References

1989 births
Living people
American artists